Karaalioğlu Park is a large park in Antalya, Turkey. It is just south of Kaleiçi in the city center, easily reached on foot or by tram. The mayor's office, Municipal city theater, and an ancient fortress called Hıdırlık Tower overlooking the Roman harbor, view of the cliffs and the broad blue expanse of the Gulf of Antalya are major attractions of the park.

Urban History museum is planning to the park as of mid 2000s.

References

Tourist attractions in Antalya
Parks in Turkey
Geography of Antalya Province